Marten Liiv (born 23 December 1996) is an Estonian speed skater. Liiv represented Estonia at the 2018 Winter Olympics in Pyeongchang. He represented Estonia in the 2022 Winter Olympics.

He won a bronze medal at the 2016 World Junior Speed Skating Championships in 1000 m event.

He also holds several national records.

Records

Personal records

References 

Olympic speed skaters of Estonia
Speed skaters at the 2018 Winter Olympics
Speed skaters at the 2022 Winter Olympics
1996 births
Estonian male speed skaters
Sportspeople from Jõgeva
Living people